Lyonville is a town located in the Shire of Hepburn, Victoria, Australia. East of Daylesford on the Trentham road, the town takes its name from James Lyon who had arrived in the Glenlyon district in the 1860s. At the 2016 census, Lyonville had a population of 175.

History
James Lyon had built a large saw-mill by 1876 in the Bullarook Forest. He had built second saw-mill by 1881 and most of the adult male residents in the community were employed in them. There was a state school with 60 students by 1881. Lyonville was in the electoral district of Creswick by 1877.
Lyonville Post Office opened on 15 May 1882 and closed in 1993.

The Lyonville railway station was on the Carlsruhe to Daylesford line from 1880 and it closed in 1978.
The Daylesford Spa Country Railway tourist railway is planning extensions of the track to Lyonville in the future.

Modern Lyonville
The local attractions include the Lyonville Spring, Lyonville Hatha Yoga studio and The Radio Springs Hotel. The latter was once owned by the radio and television personality Ernie Sigley.

References

Towns in Victoria (Australia)